The 1999 Stanford Cardinal baseball team represented Stanford University in the 1999 NCAA Division I baseball season. The Cardinal played their home games at Sunken Diamond. The team was coached by Mark Marquess in his 23rd year at Stanford.

The Cardinal won the Palo Alto Regional and the Palo Alto Super Regional to advanced to the College World Series, where they were defeated by the Florida State Seminoles.

Roster

Schedule 

! style="" | Regular Season: 43–13
|- valign="top" 

|- align="center" bgcolor="#ddffdd"
| 1 || January 29 ||  || No. 8 || Sunken Diamond • Stanford, California || W 1–0 || 1–0 || –
|- align="center" bgcolor="#ffdddd"
| 2 || January 30 || Fresno State || No. 8 || Sunken Diamond • Stanford, California || L 6–8 || 1–1 || –
|- align="center" bgcolor="#ffdddd"
| 3 || January 31 || Fresno State || No. 8 || Sunken Diamond • Stanford, California || L 3–5 || 1–2 || –
|-

|- align="center" bgcolor="#ffdddd"
| 4 || February 5 || at No. 11  || No. 8 || Titan Field • Fullerton, California || L 0–8 || 1–3 || –
|- align="center" bgcolor="#ddffdd"
| 5 || February 6 || at No. 11 Cal State Fullerton || No. 8 || Titan Field • Fullerton, California || W 6–5 || 2–3 || –
|- align="center" bgcolor="#ddffdd"
| 6 || February 7 || at No. 11 Cal State Fullerton || No. 8 || Titan Field • Fullerton, California || W 13–7 || 3–3 || –
|- align="center" bgcolor="#ddffdd"
| 7 || February 10 ||  || No. 12 || Sunken Diamond • Stanford, California || W 5–0 || 4–3 || –
|- align="center" bgcolor="#ddffdd"
| 8 || February 13 || at  || No. 12 || Stephen Schott Stadium • Santa Clara, California || W 6–2 || 5–3 || –
|- align="center" bgcolor="#ddffdd"
| 9 || February 14 || Santa Clara || No. 12 || Sunken Diamond • Stanford, California || W 7–6 || 6–3 || –
|- align="center" bgcolor="#ddffdd"
| 10 || February 15 || at Santa Clara || No. 9 || Stephen Schott Stadium • Santa Clara, California || W 7–1 || 7–3 || –
|- align="center" bgcolor="#ddffdd"
| 11 || February 16 ||  || No. 9 || Sunken Diamond • Stanford, California || W 8–1 || 8–3 || –
|- align="center" bgcolor="#ddffdd"
| 12 || February 19 ||  || No. 9 || Sunken Diamond • Stanford, California || W 9–7 || 9–3 || –
|- align="center" bgcolor="#ddffdd"
| 13 || February 21 || California || No. 9 || Sunken Diamond • Stanford, California || W 5–3 || 10–3 || –
|- align="center" bgcolor="#ffdddd"
| 14 || February 22 || California || No. 5 || Sunken Diamond • Stanford, California || L 2–3 || 10–4 || –
|- align="center" bgcolor="#ddffdd"
| 15 || February 26 || at  || No. 5 || Dedeaux Field • Los Angeles, California || W 10–7 || 11–4 || –
|- align="center" bgcolor="#ddffdd"
| 16 || February 27 || at Southern California || No. 5 || Dedeaux Field • Los Angeles, California || W 5–2 || 12–4 || –
|- align="center" bgcolor="#ffdddd"
| 17 || February 28 || at Southern California || No. 5 || Dedeaux Field • Los Angeles, California || L 7–9 || 12–5 || –
|-

|- align="center" bgcolor="#ffdddd"
| 18 || March 2 ||  || No. 4 || Sunken Diamond • Stanford, California || L 4–7 || 12–6 || –
|- align="center" bgcolor="#ddffdd"
| 19 || March 5 || No. 9  || No. 4 || Sunken Diamond • Stanford, California || W 11–1 || 13–6 || 1–0
|- align="center" bgcolor="#ddffdd"
| 20 || March 6 || No. 9 Arizona State || No. 4 || Sunken Diamond • Stanford, California || W 6–5 || 14–6 || 2–0
|- align="center" bgcolor="#ddffdd"
| 21 || March 7 || No. 9 Arizona State || No. 4 || Sunken Diamond • Stanford, California || W 11–8 || 15–6 || 3–0
|- align="center" bgcolor="#ffdddd"
| 22 || March 20 || at No. 9  || No. 3 || Disch–Falk Field • Austin, Texas || L 8–9 || 15–7 || –
|- align="center" bgcolor="#ddffdd"
| 23 || March 21 || at No. 9 Texas || No. 3 || Disch–Falk Field • Austin, Texas || W 11–8 || 16–7 || –
|- align="center" bgcolor="#ffdddd"
| 24 || March 22 || at No. 9 Texas || No. 4 || Disch–Falk Field • Austin, Texas || L 3–4 || 16–8 || –
|- align="center" bgcolor="#ddffdd"
| 25 || March 24 || at  || No. 4 || L. Dale Mitchell Baseball Park • Norman, Oklahoma || W 5–1 || 17–8 || –
|- align="center" bgcolor="#ddffdd"
| 26 || March 26 || at Arizona || No. 4 || Jerry Kindall Field at Frank Sancet Stadium • Tucson, Arizona || W 8–4 || 18–8 || 4–0
|- align="center" bgcolor="#ddffdd"
| 27 || March 27 || at Arizona || No. 4 || Jerry Kindall Field at Frank Sancet Stadium • Tucson, Arizona || W 12–4 || 19–8 || 5–0
|- align="center" bgcolor="#ddffdd"
| 28 || March 28 || at Arizona || No. 4 || Jerry Kindall Field at Frank Sancet Stadium • Tucson, Arizona || W 12–11 || 20–8 || 6–0
|-

|- align="center" bgcolor="#ddffdd"
| 29 || April 1 ||  || No. 3 || Sunken Diamond • Stanford, California || W 9–3 || 21–8 || 7–0
|- align="center" bgcolor="#ddffdd"
| 30 || April 2 || Washington State || No. 3 || Sunken Diamond • Stanford, California || W 6–5 || 22–8 || 8–0
|- align="center" bgcolor="#ddffdd"
| 31 || April 3 || Washington State || No. 3 || Sunken Diamond • Stanford, California || W 9–0 || 23–8 || 9–0
|- align="center" bgcolor="#ffdddd"
| 32 || April 9 || at  || No. 2 || Husky Ballpark • Seattle, Washington || L 2–3 || 23–9 || 9–1
|- align="center" bgcolor="#ddffdd"
| 33 || April 10 || at Washington || No. 2 || Husky Ballpark • Seattle, Washington || W 7–4 || 24–9 || 10–1
|- align="center" bgcolor="#ddffdd"
| 34 || April 11 || at Washington || No. 2 || Husky Ballpark • Seattle, Washington || W 13–10 || 25–9 || 11–1
|- align="center" bgcolor="#ddffdd"
| 35 || April 13 ||  || No. 2 || Sunken Diamond • Stanford, California || W 7–3 || 26–9 || –
|- align="center" bgcolor="#ffdddd"
| 36 || April 16 || No. 22 Southern California || No. 2 || Sunken Diamond • Stanford, California || L 1–10 || 26–10 || 11–2
|- align="center" bgcolor="#ddffdd"
| 37 || April 17 || No. 22 Southern California || No. 2 || Sunken Diamond • Stanford, California || W 13–2 || 27–10 || 12–2
|- align="center" bgcolor="#ffdddd"
| 38 || April 18 || No. 22 Southern California || No. 2 || Sunken Diamond • Stanford, California || L 15–17 || 27–11 || 12–3
|- align="center" bgcolor="#ffdddd"
| 39 || April 23 || at California || No. 5 || Evans Diamond • Berkeley, California || L 9–11 || 27–12 || 12–4
|- align="center" bgcolor="#ddffdd"
| 40 || April 24 || at California || No. 5 || Evans Diamond • Berkeley, California || W 14–11 || 28–12 || 13–4
|- align="center" bgcolor="#ddffdd"
| 41 || April 25 || at California || No. 5 || Evans Diamond • Berkeley, California || W 13–5 || 29–12 || 14–4
|- align="center" bgcolor="#ddffdd"
| 42 || April 27 ||  || No. 5 || Sunken Diamond • Stanford, California || W 8–3 || 30–12 || –
|- align="center" bgcolor="#ddffdd"
| 43 || April 30 ||  || No. 5 || Sunken Diamond • Stanford, California || W 7–0 || 31–12 || 15–4
|-

|- align="center" bgcolor="#ddffdd"
| 44 || May 1 || Oregon State || No. 5 || Sunken Diamond • Stanford, California || W 10–5 || 32–12 || 16–4
|- align="center" bgcolor="#ddffdd"
| 45 || May 2 || Oregon State || No. 5 || Sunken Diamond • Stanford, California || W 9–8 || 33–12 || 17–4
|- align="center" bgcolor="#ddffdd"
| 46 || May 4 || at No. 30 Nevada || No. 5 || William Peccole Park • Reno, Nevada || W 16–14 || 34–12 || –
|- align="center" bgcolor="#ddffdd"
| 47 || May 5 ||  || No. 5 || Sunken Diamond • Stanford, California || W 2–1 || 35–12 || –
|- align="center" bgcolor="#ddffdd"
| 48 || May 7 || Saint Mary's || No. 5 || Sunken Diamond • Stanford, California || W 4–3 || 36–12 || –
|- align="center" bgcolor="#ddffdd"
| 49 || May 10 || San Francisco || No. 5 || Sunken Diamond • Stanford, California || W 16–3 || 37–12 || –
|- align="center" bgcolor="#ddffdd"
| 50 || May 11 || Santa Clara || No. 5 || Sunken Diamond • Stanford, California || W 12–5 || 38–12 || –
|- align="center" bgcolor="#ddffdd"
| 51 || May 14 || at  || No. 5 || Jackie Robinson Stadium • Los Angeles, California || W 8–7 || 39–12 || 18–4
|- align="center" bgcolor="#ffdddd"
| 52 || May 15 || at UCLA || No. 5 || Jackie Robinson Stadium • Los Angeles, California || L 7–12 || 39–13 || 18–5
|- align="center" bgcolor="#ddffdd"
| 53 || May 16 || at UCLA || No. 5 || Jackie Robinson Stadium • Los Angeles, California || W 14–4 || 40–13 || 19–5
|- align="center" bgcolor="#ddffdd"
| 54 || May 20 ||  || No. 5 || Sunken Diamond • Stanford, California || W 8–1 || 41–13 || –
|- align="center" bgcolor="#ddffdd"
| 55 || May 21 || Cal Poly || No. 5 || Sunken Diamond • Stanford, California || W 13–2 || 42–13 || –
|- align="center" bgcolor="#ddffdd"
| 56 || May 22 || Cal Poly || No. 5 || Sunken Diamond • Stanford, California || W 12–9 || 43–13 || –
|-

|-
|-
! style="" | Postseason: 7–2
|- valign="top"

|- align="center" bgcolor="#ddffdd"
| 57 || May 28 || (4)  || (1) No. 5 || Sunken Diamond • Stanford, California || W 10–2 || 44–13 || 1–0
|- align="center" bgcolor="#ddffdd"
| 58 || May 29 || (3) No. 21  || (1) No. 5 || Sunken Diamond • Stanford, California || W 7–4 || 45–13 || 2–0
|- align="center" bgcolor="#ddffdd"
| 59 || May 30 || (2) Nevada || (1) No. 5 || Sunken Diamond • Stanford, California || W 7–4 || 46–13 || 3–0
|-

|- align="center" bgcolor="#ddffdd"
| 60 || June 4 || No. 11 Southern California || (6) No. 5 || Sunken Diamond • Stanford, California || W 1–0 || 47–13 || 4–0
|- align="center" bgcolor="#ddffdd"
| 61 || June 5 || No. 11 Southern California || (6) No. 5 || Sunken Diamond • Stanford, California || W 5–3 || 48–13 || 5–0
|-

|- align="center" bgcolor="#ddffdd"
| 62 || June 12 || vs. (3) No. 4  || (6) No. 5 || Johnny Rosenblatt Stadium • Omaha, Nebraska || W 9–2 || 49–13 || 1–0
|- align="center" bgcolor="#ddffdd"
| 63 || June 14 || vs. (2) No. 3 Florida State || (6) No. 5 || Johnny Rosenblatt Stadium • Omaha, Nebraska || W 10–6 || 50–13 || 2–0
|- align="center" bgcolor="#ffdddd"
| 64 || June 17 || vs. (2) No. 3 Florida State || (6) No. 5 || Johnny Rosenblatt Stadium • Omaha, Nebraska || L 6–8 || 50–14 || 1–2
|- align="center" bgcolor="#ffdddd"
| 65 || June 18 || vs. (2) No. 3 Florida State || (6) No. 5 || Johnny Rosenblatt Stadium • Omaha, Nebraska || L 11–14 || 50–15 || 2–2
|-

Awards and honors 
Joe Borchard
 All-Pac-10 Conference

John Gall
 All-Pac-10 Conference
 College World Series All-Tournament Team

Josh Hochgesang
 All-Pac-10 Conference

Jason Young
 All-Pac-10 Conference
 First Team All-American National Collegiate Baseball Writers Association
 Second Team All-American Baseball America
 Second Team All-American Collegiate Baseball

Brian Sager
 First Team Freshman All-American Baseball America
 First Team Freshman All-American Collegiate Baseball

References 

Stanford Cardinal baseball seasons
Stanford Cardinal baseball
College World Series seasons
Stanford
Pac-12 Conference baseball champion seasons